Bleo Pedro Fournol, mostly known as Pedro Calomino (also nicknamed Calumín)  (13 March 1892 – 12 January 1950) was an Argentine footballer who played as right winger. Calomino spent nearly all of his career in Boca Juniors, having also played 37 games for the Argentina national team where he scored 5 goals. It is claimed that Calomino invented the step over move

Calomino is also regarded to be the first idol of Boca Juniors –where he won 9 titles– and one of the best right wingers of Argentina. With Argentina he won the 1921 South American Championship, the first official title for the national team.

Club career
A representative of Boca Juniors saw Calomino playing in a field in Retiro and convinced him to play for the club. Calomino debuted in the third division v River Plate. His good performances led him to be promoted to upper divisions, debuting in the senior squad in 1911, when Boca still played in Segunda División. In 1912 he moved to Argentino de Quilmes, where he was soon regarded as the best right winger in Argentina.

Calomino had brief returns to Boca Juniors (1913) and Argentino de Quilmes (1914), also playing for Hispano Argentino until 1915 when he returned to Boca Juniors, playing there until the end of his career in 1924. Calomino played a total of 222 games for Boca scoring 96 goals. He was Boca Juniors' top scoring player in six seasons: 1913, 1915, 1916, 1917, 1918 and 1919. This record has only been surpassed by Martín Palermo, who accomplished the feat eight times.

On May 25, 1940, when the club inaugurated La Bombonera, Calomino was appointed by the club to raise the Argentine flag during the ceremony.

International career
Calomino debuted in the national team on 15 August 1917 v Uruguay. He represented Argentina in four South American Championships: 1917, 1919, 1920 and 1921. In his final tournament, he captained Argentina to victory.

Honours

Club

Boca Juniors
 Primera División (4): 1919, 1920, 1923, 1924
 Copa Competencia Jockey Club (1): 1919
 Copa Ibarguren (2): 1919, 1923
 Tie Cup (1): 1919
 Copa de Honor Cousenier (1): 1920

International
Argentina
Copa América (1): 1921

Notes

References

1892 births
1950 deaths
Argentine people of Italian descent
Footballers from Buenos Aires
Argentine footballers
Association football wingers
Boca Juniors footballers
Argentine Primera División players
Argentina international footballers
Burials at La Chacarita Cemetery